Carlos García y García (19 November 1927 – 10 May 2016) was a Peruvian former Fujimorist politician and Baptist pastor.

Political career 
He served as the Second Vice President of Peru from July 28, 1990 to April 5, 1992 during the Presidency of Alberto Fujimori. Though García y García was a member of Fujimori's Cambio 90, he publicly condemned Fujimori's coup and constitutional crisis, which took place on 5 April 1992.

García y García, a Baptist minister, also served as the President of the National Evangelical Council (Concilio Nacional Evangélico). In July 2002, García y García was awarded the Medalla de Honor del Congreso (Grand Officer) for his defense of democracy and the Constitution during the 1992 Peruvian constitutional crisis.

Death 
Carlos García y García died on 10 May 2016 at the age of 88. His wake and viewing was held at a church in the Lince District of Lima on 12 May 2016.

References

1927 births
2016 deaths
Vice presidents of Peru
Members of the Chamber of Deputies of Peru
Fujimorista politicians
20th-century Baptist ministers
People from Lima